George "Ripper" Williams was a college football player. He was a prominent quarterback for the Auburn Tigers, leading the team to an undefeated 1932 season and captain of the 1933 team. Williams is a member of the Colbert County Sports Hall of Fame.

References

American football quarterbacks
Auburn Tigers football players